Zhu Chengliang 朱成梁 is a prizewinning Chinese author and illustrator of children's books, often using traditional Chinese painting styles.

Biography 
Zhu Chengliang was born in Shanghai in 1948, and spent his childhood in Suzhou. He studied at the Department of Fine Art, Nanjing University, and has worked as an author, illustrator, editor and designer. He is currently Deputy Chief Editor of the Jiangsu Fine Arts Publishing House.

Awards and honours 
 Grandpa's Tinderbox was nominated for the IBBY Honour List 2014
 A New Year's Reunion (Chinese edition) won first prize in the Feng Zikai Children's Book Award 2010
 A New Year's Reunion (English translation) was listed as one of the 2011 Ten Best Illustrated Books by the New York Times
 The Sparkling Rabbit-Shaped Lamp was a Runner Up in the 4th UNESCO Noma Concours for Picture Book Illustrations (1984)

Works 
 All in a Day (author: Mitsumasa Anno), 1986
 The Story of the Kitchen God, 1988
 Flame (author: Xi Dun= ET Seton), 2007
 A New Year's Reunion (author: Yu Li-qiong), 2008
 Grandpa's Tinderbox, 2013
 Sweet Laba Congee (author: Zhang Qiusheng), Reycraft Books, 2020

References

External links 

 Zhu Chengliang on Goodreads
 IBBY dossier for Zhu Chengliang (nominated for the Hans Christian Andersen Award)

1948 births
Living people
Chinese children's book illustrators
Chinese children's writers
Nanjing University alumni